Bakers Hill is a town  east of Perth, Western Australia on the Great Eastern Highway. The town is located within the Shire of Northam, between Wundowie and Clackline.

History
The town was originally known as Mount Baker when it was established in 1897. In 1902, the name was changed to Baker's Hill to avoid confusion with the town of Mount Barker in the Great Southern area. The apostrophe was removed from the name in 1944.

Military history
During World War II, Bakers Hill was the location of the 62nd Field Park Company of the Royal Australian Engineers (RAE).

Railways
Bakers Hill was also a station and siding on the second route of the Eastern Railway between Midland Junction and Spencers Brook. This track was closed in 1966 when the route through the Avon Valley was opened.

Although the rail was removed in 1980, remnants of the old station platform are still visible.

Climate
Bakers Hill has a Mediterranean climate with hot dry summers and cool, rather wet winters.

References

Towns in Western Australia
Shire of Northam